Dryden Hall is a building located at 450 Southwest 30th Street on the Oregon State University campus in Corvallis, Oregon, United States.

References

Oregon State University buildings